Ochyrotica taiwanica is a moth in the family Pterophoridae. It is found in Taiwan.

The wingspan is about 15 mm. Adults have been recorded in November and January.

References

Moths described in 1990
Ochyroticinae